The discography of St. Vincent, an American musician, consists of seven studio albums, two remix albums, four extended plays (EP), 22 singles and 15 music videos. Annie Clark began recording under the St. Vincent name in 2006 and released her debut studio album, Marry Me, the following year. Subsequent releases include Actor (2009), Strange Mercy (2011), and a collaborative album with David Byrne titled Love This Giant (2012). The self-titled St. Vincent album (2014) won a Grammy for Best Alternative Album. St. Vincent's fifth studio album, Masseduction, was released in 2017.

Albums

Studio albums

Soundtrack albums

Remix albums

Live albums

Extended plays

Singles

Other certified songs

Other appearances

Remixes

Music videos

Notes

References

External links
 Official website
 St. Vincent at AllMusic
 
 

Discographies of American artists
Alternative rock discographies
Discography